Naciria is a town and commune in Algeria.

It may also refer to: 

 Naciria District, a district in Algeria.
 2008 Naciria bombing, a terrorist attack in Algeria.